Bridge County is a 50-acre integrated township located at Diwancheruvu, Rajamahendravaram, Andhra Pradesh, India opposite Godavari Institute of Engineering and Technology, in Rajamahendravaram City. The township is being developed by the Pragnya Riverbridge Developers, the agency that built the HSBC tower in Vizag, the Genexx Exotica group of apartments in West Bengal, and the Platinum 1 in Colombo.

Bridge County is called "Mini-America" by locals.

Development 
Development of Bridge County began in 2013, and all construction work was expected to be completed by 2017. Bridge County was to have four parks, a shopping center, a club, gym, cinema theatre and a swimming pool.

Gallery

External links 
 Bridge County Apartments and Villas Website

References 

Cities and towns in East Godavari district